Tarras may refer to:

 Tarras, New Zealand
 Elisabeth Tarras-Wahlberg (born 1950)
 Walter Scott, Earl of Tarras (1644-1693), nobleman
 Dave Tarras (1895-1989), musician

See also

 Tarra (disambiguation)